Marita inornata is a species of sea snail, a marine gastropod mollusk in the family Mangeliidae.

Description

The length of the shell attains 8.5 mm, its diameter 3 mm.

The white shell has a fusiform shape. The acuminate spire has a sharp apex. It contains seven whorls, of which two in the protoconch. The subsequent whorls are angulated. They are crossed by very obscure lirae and faintly discernible ribs, becoming obsolete on the body whorl. The body whorl shows many inconspicuous lirae. The aperture is oblong. The columella is straight. The outer lip is sharp and slightly sinuate below.

Distribution
This marine species is endemic to Australia and occurs off South Australia.

References

 Verco, J.C. 1909. Notes on South Australian marine Mollusca with descriptions of new species. Part XII. Transactions of the Royal Society of South Australia 33: 293-342

External links
  Hedley C. 1922. A revision of the Australian Turridae. Records of the Australian Museum 13(6): 213-359
  Tucker, J.K. 2004 Catalog of recent and fossil turrids (Mollusca: Gastropoda). Zootaxa 682:1-1295.
 

inornata
Gastropods described in 1896
Gastropods of Australia